Slivnitza Metro Station is a station on the Sofia Metro in Bulgaria. It opened on 28 January 1998.

Interchange with other public transport
 City Bus service: 82, 108, 309
 Suburban Bus service: 47, 48, 49, 54, 81

Location

External links
 Sofia Metropolitan (Official site)
 Unofficial site
 360 degree panorama from outside the station (north end)

Sofia Metro stations
Railway stations opened in 1998
1998 establishments in Bulgaria